Romita Ray Kapoor (born March 28, 1970) is an Indian-born American art historian, educator, and curator. Ray is currently Associate Professor of Art and Music Histories at Syracuse University.

Career
Born in Kolkata to Jyoti and Arundhati, Ray moved to the United States to attend Smith College, earning a Bachelor of Arts in 1992. She then received three degrees in Art History from Yale University: a Master of Arts in 1994, a Master of Philosophy in 1995, and a Doctor of Philosophy in 1999. Her dissertation, under the direction of Esther da Costa Meyer, was titled "The Painted Raj: The Art of the Picturesque in British India, 1757-1911."

Ray began her teaching career as a Visiting Assistant Professor at Colby College in 1998. She spent a year there before joining the University of Georgia as a postdoctoral fellow. In 2000, Ray was named to the joint appointment of Adjunct Assistant Professor of Art History, as well as Curator of Prints and Drawings at the Georgia Museum of Art.

In 2006, Ray joined Syracuse University as Assistant Professor of Art History. A scholar of British India, she is currently Associate Professor of Art and Music Histories.

See also
List of people from Kolkata
List of Smith College people
List of Syracuse University people
List of University of Georgia people
List of Yale University people

References

External links
Syracuse University profile
Academia profile

1970 births
Living people
People from Kolkata
21st-century American women
American art curators
American art historians
American women historians
Women art historians
Smith College alumni
Yale University alumni
Colby College faculty
University of Georgia faculty
Syracuse University faculty
American women curators